The Bharali or Jia Bharali (also known as Kameng) is a tributary of the Brahmaputra River in the Indian state of Assam. The Bharali river originates in the hills of Arunachal Pradesh and flows through the heart of Tezpur before its confluence with the Brahmaputra river.

Etymology
The name Bharali or Bharalu originate from Boro goddess name - Bhollobri.

References

Rivers of Assam